Samson Ricardo (1792–1862) was a British politician who served as the Whig MP for Windsor from a by election in 1855 to 1857. He had failed to win the seat in the 1852 general election and lost it in the 1857 general election.

He was a member of the wealthy Sephardic Jewish Ricardo family of Portuguese origin whose members include the political economist David Ricardo. He was also the business partner of his nephew John Lewis Ricardo, with whom he became an investor and director of the Electric Telegraph Company.

References

1792 births
1862 deaths
Members of the Parliament of the United Kingdom for English constituencies
UK MPs 1852–1857
Whig (British political party) MPs